Jersey No. 10  was an Indian Hindi language television serial of SAB TV. It was premiered on 5 November 2007. Its story revolved around a Cricket academy.

Plot 
The story revolves around two step-brothers, Nakul and Arjun, who share have a dream of becoming India's next cricket superstar. The star of the cricket academy, Arjun, inherits his father's throne and is popular and wealthy; whereas Nakul, the only child of a single mother, has struggled. They meet and a series of revelations follow that make Nakul's struggle more meaningful and poignant.

While the youngsters struggle to find their places in the world, the adults are left to deal with the consequences of decisions they made years ago. Nakul's father –Raghuveer Rai and mother Leela Salgaonkar were college sweethearts. When Leela became pregnant during their senior year, she was devastated by Raghuveer's decision to put his own life and career first. When Raghuveer's dream of a cricket career faded, he returned to town with his new wife and his newborn son, Arjun. When Leela returns to Lonavala with Nakul, her memories haunt her.

Cast
 Shravan Reddy as Nakul Rai
 Sukirti Kandpal as Sakshi
 Abhinav Shukla as Arjun Rai
 Namrata Ramsay as Ashu
  Rituraj Singh as Raghuveer Rai, Nakul and Arjun's father
 Shilpa Tulaskar as Leela Salgaonkar, Nakul's mother
 Sonia Kapoor as Mrs. Rai, Raghuveer's wife; Arjun's mother
 Sanjeet Bedi
 Dimple Inamdar
 Jiten Lalwani
 Parikshit Sahni
 Geetanjali Tikekar as Psychotherapist

References

Sony SAB original programming
Indian drama television series
2007 Indian television series debuts
Indian sports television series
Indian teen drama television series
Cricket on television